The R392 is a Regional Route in South Africa that connects the R396 between Queenstown and Lady Frere to the R393 via Lady Grey. It is co-signed with the R58 past Lady Grey.

External links
 Routes Travel Info

References

Regional Routes in the Eastern Cape